El día que me quieras may refer to:
"El día que me quieras" (song), a song by Carlos Gardel
El día que me quieras (1935 film), a 1935 musical film starring Carlos Gardel
El Día que me quieras (1969 film), a 1969 Argentine film
El día que me quieras (1986 film), see List of Argentine films of 1986